Keith Blunt ( – 12 August 2016) was an English football coach. He was first team coach at Plymouth Argyle before leaving to manage Sutton United from the late seventies until moving onto Malmö and then Viking in 1984. In 1987, he was coach of Tottenham Hotspur's youth team, before leaving to join Gillingham. In 1997, Blunt was head coach at the Centre of Excellence in Lilleshall in England. From 1998, he worked as a football coach at various teams in China, including the national women’s team, the men’s  U-23 and U-19.

He spent time with Loughborough College.

References 

1930s births
2016 deaths
English football managers
Viking FK managers
Malmö FF managers
Gillingham F.C. managers
Sutton United F.C. managers
Expatriate football managers in China
Expatriate football managers in Sweden
Expatriate football managers in Norway
English expatriate sportspeople in China
English expatriate sportspeople in Sweden
English expatriate sportspeople in Norway
English expatriate football managers
English footballers
Loughborough University F.C. players
Association footballers not categorized by position